Likeleli Tampane is the current Minister of Gender and Youth, Sports and Recreation in Lesotho. She was formerly the Minister of Tourism, Environment and Culture.

Background and education 
Likeleli Tampane was born in Mabuleng, Mokhotolong district in Lesotho. Tampane has a Bachelor’s Degree in Pastoral Care and Counselling from the National University of Lesotho and also a Master’s Degree in Public Sector Management from the African university, Zimbabwe. She also earned a certificate in Adult Education.

Career 
Tampane was a member of the executive of the African Peer Review Mechanism; in 2011 she stood as a representative sent to South Africa to prepare for Lesotho’s African Peer Review Mechanism launch. In 2012 Tampane was appointed as a Member of the Parliament in Lesotho. She also worked as a Teacher and Librarian in Mapholaneng High School in Lesotho.  Tampane has held various positions in the government sectors.

References 

People from Mokhotlong District
Government ministers of Lesotho
Members of the National Assembly (Lesotho)
Living people
National University of Lesotho alumni
Year of birth missing (living people)